Our American Heritage is a series of TV specials broadcast on NBC from 1959 to 1961. 

Mildred Freed Alberg produced the program with the cooperation of American Heritage magazine. Lowell Thomas was the narrator. Directors included James Lee, Jack Smight and Alex Segal Writers included Ted Mosel, David Shaw, and Mann Rubin. 

A total of thirteen episodes were aired on the National Broadcasting Company from October 18, 1959 to May 13, 1961. Actors who were featured included Raymond Massey, Dean Jagger, Walter Matthau, Roddy McDowell, Christopher Plummer, Susan Strasberg, Melvyn Douglas, Robert Redford, and Teresa Wright.

On January 27, 1960, the Thomas Alva Edison Foundations recognized Our American Heritage as "the television program best portraying America". The program was sponsored by The Equitable Life Assurance Society.

Episodes of the program included those shown in the table below:

References

External links

Our American Heritage at CVTA with episode list

1959 American television series debuts
1961 American television series endings
1950s American anthology television series
1960s American anthology television series
NBC original programming